Lucius Aurelius Orestes (Latin, Lucius Aurelius L. f. L. n. Orestes) was a magistrate and consul in the service of the Roman Republic. He was consul in the year 157 BC together with Sextus Julius Caesar. He was further mentioned in the Roman Fasti and by Gaius Plinius Secundus in his work Historia Naturalis.

References 

Orestes, Lucius
2nd-century BC Roman consuls
2nd-century BC diplomats